Coleophora trientella is a moth of the family Coleophoridae. It is found in Slovenia, Slovakia, Hungary, Romania, Serbia and Montenegro, Ukraine, southern Russia, Turkestan, the Palestinian Territories and China. It occurs in desert biotopes and in salt-marshes.

Adults are on wing in spring and at end of summer. There are possibly two generations per year.

The larvae feed on the flowers of Corispermum species, including Corispermum lehmannianum. They create a silky, short, thick case. Near the cephalic end and along the sides, there are symmetrically arranged halves of membrane of hollowed-out fruit. The valve is three sided and the length is 4–5 mm. The color is dark brown. Larvae can be found from May to June.

References

trientella
Moths of Europe
Moths of Asia
Moths described in 1872